Gliese 1132 b (also known as GJ 1132 b) is an exoplanet orbiting the red dwarf star Gliese 1132 40 light years (13 parsecs) from Earth, in the constellation Vela. The planet is considered uninhabitable but cool enough to possess an atmosphere. Gliese 1132 b was discovered by the MEarth-South array in Chile.

It has been called "one of the most important planets ever discovered beyond the Solar System": Due to its relative proximity to Earth, telescopes should be able to determine the composition of its atmosphere, the speed of its winds and the color of its sunsets. This is due in part to the small diameter of its parent star (20% that of the Sun), which increases the effect on the star's light of its transits. The planet's diameter is approximately 20% larger than that of the Earth and its mass is estimated at 1.6 times that of Earth, implying that it has an Earth-like rocky composition.  Gliese 1132 b orbits its star every 1.6 days at a distance of 1.4 million miles (2.24 million kilometres).

The planet receives 19 times more stellar radiation than Earth. The planet is estimated to be hotter than Venus, as higher temperatures may prevail near the surface. (cf. Atmosphere of Venus, Colonization of Venus) It is possible that one side of the planet is cooler, because it is presumed to be tidally locked due to its proximity to its star; however, under most circumstances where an atmosphere is thick, it would be able to transfer heat to the far side.

Atmosphere
In April 2017, a hydrogen-dominated atmosphere was claimed to have been detected around Gliese 1132 b. However, subsequent, more precise work ruled out the claim. Instead, in 2021 detection of a hazy hydrogen atmosphere without helium but with the admixture methane and hydrogen cyanide (implying substantial underlying free nitrogen in the mix, at around 8.9% of the atmosphere) was claimed. However, two subsequent studies found no evidence for molecular absorption in the HST WFC3 Spectrum of GJ 1132 b. Instead, the spectrum was found to be flat, which is more consistent with our current understanding of photoevaporation.

Gallery

See also
 Habitability of red dwarf systems
 HD 219134 b

References

Exoplanets discovered in 2015
1132
Vela (constellation)